Vasile Fernando Mihai (also known as Vasile Fernando Nicolae; born 29 November 1995) is a Romanian professional footballer who plays as a midfielder.

Honours
FC Voluntari
Romanian Cup : 2016-17

References

External links
 
 

1995 births
Living people
People from Tecuci
Romanian footballers
Association football midfielders
Liga I players
Liga II players
Liga III players
FC Voluntari players
CS Afumați players
SSU Politehnica Timișoara players
CS Balotești players